Lo Esencial or Lo Esencial de  may refer to:

Lo Esencial (Aterciopelados album)
Lo Esencial (Jeanette album)
Lo Esencial, album by Alejandra Guzmán
Lo Esencial, album by Armando Manzanero
Lo Esencial, album by Dark Latin Groove
Lo Esencial, album by Emmanuel
Lo Esencial, album by Joan Sebastian
Lo Esencial, album by José Alfredo Jiménez
Lo Esencial, album by Rocío Dúrcal
Lo Esencial, album by Son by Four
Lo Esencial, album by Willy Chirino
Lo Esencial de... Alejandro Sanz, album by Alejandro SánzLo Esencial de Maná, album by ManáLo Esencial de Ricardo Arjona, album by Ricardo ArjonaLo Esencial de Álvaro, album by Álvaro TorresLo Esencial de La Arrolladora Banda El Limón, album by La Arrolladora Banda El LimónLo Esencial de Ana Gabriel, album by Ana GabrielLo Esencial de Annette Moreno, album by Annette MorenoLo Esencial de Belinda, album by Belinda PeregrínLo Esencial de Café Tacvba, album by Café TacubaLo Esencial de Fey, album by FeyLo Esencial de Juan Gabriel, album by Juan GabrielLo Esencial de Leo Dan, album by Leo DanLo Esencial de Lucía Méndez, album by Lucía MéndezLo Esencial de Maelo, album by Maelo RuizLo Esencial de Yuridia'', album by Yuridia

See also
Esencial (disambiguation)